Shestov (masculine) or Shestova (feminine) is a Russian surname. Notable people with the surname include:

Lev Shestov (1866–1938), Ukrainian/Russian - Jewish existentialist philosopher
Xenia Shestova (1560–1631), Russian nun and mother of Mikhail I of Russia

Russian-language surnames